Natasha Staniszewski (born May 25, 1978) is a Canadian sports reporter and media host for the Calgary Flames and Calgary Stampeders. She is a former anchor on SportsCentre, TSN's flagship news and information show.

Broadcasting career

Staniszewski began her career in 2006 as a news reporter at CTV Yorkton in Saskatchewan, before moving to sports reporting at CTV Prince Albert. In 2007, she relocated to CTV Saskatoon as the station's sports anchor and reporter covering the WHL and university athletics.

Two years later, Staniszewski returned home to CTV Edmonton in 2009, where she covered the Edmonton Oilers, the Edmonton Eskimos and the 2010 Grey Cup, and anchored the station's top-rated nightly and weekend sportscasts. After covering the 2010 Grey Cup, TSN vice-president Mark Melliere was looking for someone to cover Jennifer Hedger's anchor position while she left for maternity leave. Staniszewski eventually co-hosted the weekend SportsCentre alongside Bryan Mudryk following Holly Horton's departure in 2011. Soon after, she moved over to the morning SportsCentre co-hosting with Kate Beirness, becoming the first regular female duo to anchor the show. She then anchored SportsCentre regularly with another female, Lindsay Hamilton, and the female duo acted as the alternative morning show to SC with Jay and Dan.

On February 4, 2021 after 10 years at TSN, Staniszewski was let go as part of a series of layoffs at Bell Media. On March 8, 2022, it was announced that she had been hired by Calgary Sports and Entertainment as a media host for the Calgary Flames and Calgary Stampeders.

Personal life

Staniszewski was born and raised in Edmonton, Alberta, and is of Polish descent.

She was an athlete growing up, excelling in basketball and volleyball, winning a provincial title in the latter in high school. She then earned a business degree from the University of Alberta but decided at the age of 26 that she did not want to pursue a career in business, but rather a career as a sports broadcaster. She went on to complete her broadcasting degree at NAIT in Edmonton.

References

1978 births
Living people
Canadian women television journalists
Canadian people of Polish descent
Canadian television sportscasters
Journalists from Alberta
People from Edmonton
University of Alberta alumni